The Vivarail D-Train is a family of multiple units remanufactured by Vivarail for the British rail network. They are converted from London Underground D78 Stock, originally manufactured between 1978 and 1981 by Metro-Cammell. Two versions have been produced: the Class 230 diesel electric multiple unit and the Class 484 electric multiple unit.

History 
In 2015, Vivarail purchased 226 London Underground D78 Stock carriages with the aim of converting them to multiple units. It was estimated that they would cost one-third of that of a new build train.

Prototypes 

A prototype was produced for testing and accreditation in August 2015. The initial prototype D-Train was built as a three-car diesel-electric unit, which was completed in the summer of 2016, following which it underwent a programme of main-line testing, with the intention that it be used on a year-long trial service on the Coventry to Nuneaton line by London Midland. This was cancelled after the unit caught fire.

The second prototype was built as a two-car battery-electric unit; although self-powered like the original, instead of a diesel engine to power the traction motors, this unit uses batteries that can be recharged from a charging point at each end of its journey. This unit was complete by the summer of 2018, and was put on a testing programme. In October 2018, it was taken to the Bo'ness & Kinneil Railway carrying its first passengers. This culminated in the battery powered unit running a distance of 40 miles using battery power alone, a first for a train in the UK, in January 2020.

A feature that has been reintroduced in these units include the passenger door open buttons. When first introduced in 1980 in unpainted livery the units consisted of door buttons on the exterior and interior pressed by passengers to open the doors. Upon refurbishment, the interior door buttons were removed and the exterior ones were panelled over. After conversion this feature was provided again similar to London Underground pre-refurbishment.

Orders

West Midlands Trains 
The first full D-Train order came from West Midlands Trains, which procured three 2-car  DEMUs for use on the Marston Vale line. These are operated under the London Northwestern Railway brand, with the first entering service on 23 April 2019.

Transport for Wales 
A second order for Class 230s came from KeolisAmey Wales, with five 3-car sets ordered. Although these are also Class 230s, rather than straight DEMUs they will be built as diesel/battery hybrid units, to be used on the Borderlands line, Conwy Valley line and Chester to Crewe line.

Island Line 
In 2019, South Western Railway announced an order for five 2-car D-Train sets for use by its Island Line operation on the Isle of Wight. These were ordered as third rail EMUs, becoming .

Pop-up Metro 
The Railroad Development Corporation has ordered at least one 2-car -variant to operate on the Iowa Interstate Railroad in 2021 as a "pop-up" metro service.

Great Western Railway 
In February 2022, Great Western Railway announced they had signed a deal with Vivarail to trial a fast-charging battery variant of the Class 230 for use on the West Ealing to Greenford branch line off the GWML. Trials are expected to launch in late 2022 to early 2023.

D-Train variants

References

External links 
 Vivarail

British Rail electric multiple units
Train-related introductions in 2016